Chandranudikkunna Dikkil is 1999 Indian Malayalam-language romantic drama film directed by Lal Jose and written by Babu Janardhanan. It stars Dileep, Samyuktha Varma, Kavya Madhavan, Lal, Biju Menon, Jagadish, and Innocent. The  music was composed by Vidyasagar. The film was the debut movie of both Samyuktha Varma and Kavya Madhavan as lead actresses and was a commercial success.

Plot
The movie starts with Mukundan as a cab driver in Mysuru, Karnataka. He meets Hema during a trip arranged when Hema, who works as a drama artist, got held up midway in late night due to the troupe bus breaking down. A friendship grows between them. Later Mukundan shifts his residence to the area where Hema lives due to his roommate's bad behaviour. One day when Mukundan reaches to pick a trip from a lodge he finds his client Sreeram in a serious condition after a suicide attempt and Mukundan saves his life by the prompt action of calling emergency medical services. There he meets the family of his client, which reflects a wonder in him and finally goes through a flashback in which his past as a Bank Field Officer in a remote Karnataka village is narrated.

Through a series of events he meets and falls in love with Radha and plans to get married. But her brother Parthan without knowing the relationship, plans for marriage of Radha with Sreeram, who is her Lecturer in College. Mukundan falls into a trap conspired by a local goon and money lender, Mukundan's boss (who is on suspension for misappropriation of bank money) and he gets arrested by the police on charges of cheating the bank. Without knowing the truth and the fact that Mukundan is innocent, Radha is forced to marry Sreeram. In a fight, it occurs that Mukundan comes back to the village when he gets bail, the local goon, Thimmaiah, is killed and Radha's brother goes to jail taking the responsibility. Mukundan loses his job and works as a cab driver for a living. We meet Radha again at hospital as a guilt-stricken wife who cannot transform as a wife in the full and true sense as she still longs for Mukundan deeply. Due to this negligent behaviour of Radha, Sreeram tries to commit suicide and is brought back to life by Mukundan during the start of the movie.

Coming to know the miserable condition of Sreeram, Mukundan decides to fake a marriage with Hema and asks Radha to forget him and start a new life as a responsible wife admitting the change in their lives made by fate. A heartbroken Radha understands the situation and goes into the arms of Sreeram. After Radha's parting, Mukundan asks Hema to give back the Thali (nuptial pendant), in which she becomes emotional and both of them decide to enter into family life while walking down the temple on a hilltop where the marriage was set as a drama, which turned to a real commitment, hand in hand.

Cast

Soundtrack

Box office
The film was commercial success.

Awards
Kerala Film Critics Association Awards
Vidyasagar won Kerala Film Critics Award for Best Music Director for the film.

References

External links
 

1999 films
1990s Malayalam-language films
Films shot in Mysore
Films scored by Vidyasagar
Films directed by Lal Jose